Mokre Ogrody  is a settlement in the administrative district of Gmina Lwówek, within Nowy Tomyśl County, Greater Poland Voivodeship, in west-central Poland.

The settlement has a population of 9.

References

Mokre Ogrody